Maraial is a city in Pernambuco, Brazil. It is located in Zona da mata Pernambucana, 154 km from the state capital, Recife.

Geography
 State - Pernambuco
 Region - Zona da mata Pernambucana
 Boundaries - Jaqueira  (N);  Alagoas state   (S);  Xexéu and Catende  (E); São Benedito do Sul   (W)
 Area - 192.25 km2
 Elevation - 212 m
 Hydrography - Una river
 Vegetation - Subperenifólia forest
 Climate - Hot tropical and humid
 Annual average temperature - 23.6 c
 Distance to Recife - 154 km

Economy

The main economic activities in Maraial are based in food and beverage industry and agribusiness, especially sugarcane, bananas, pineapples, cattle and goats.

Economic Indicators

Economy by Sector (2006)

Health Indicators

References

Municipalities in Pernambuco